A Band Apart Films was a production company founded by Quentin Tarantino, Michael Bodnarchek, and Lawrence Bender that was active from 1991 to 2006. Its name is a play on the French New Wave classic film, Bande à part ("Band of Outsiders") by filmmaker Jean-Luc Godard, whose work was highly influential on the work of the company's members. Thanks in part to the popularity of Quentin Tarantino's and Robert Rodriguez's films, the company quickly gained cult-like status within Hollywood.

History

Tarantino formed A Band Apart in 1991, naming it after his favorite Godard film, Bande à part. The company's logo was a stylized image of the robbers from Reservoir Dogs, Tarantino's debut film. Subsequently, several legal entities within the company were named after the film's characters. Mr. Pink LLC was for music video production budgets, and Mr. Brown LLC was for commercials.

In addition to Tarantino, members of the company included Robert Rodriguez, John Woo, Tim Burton, Steve Buscemi, Darren Aronofsky, John Landis, Joseph McGinty Nichol, Nigel Dick, Varl Hobe, Steve Carr, Cameron Casey, Marcel Langenegger, Wayne Isham, Terry Windell, Lisa Prisco, Phil Harder-Rick Fuller, Coodie & Chike, Osbert Parker, Luc Besson, Porker LeVance, Adam Christian Clark, André 3000, Christopher Morrison and Michael Palmieri, Andy Mornahan, Chash Brower, Steve Lowe, Loren Hill, Darren Grant, Charles Whittenmier, Geoff McGann, Olivier Venturini, The 405 Guys, and Craig Tanamoto.

The company catapulted to fame with the 1994 release of Tarantino's Pulp Fiction, which was considered by some critics to be the most influential American film of the decade.  In the summer of 1995, the company added a division for commercials and later, for music video production, adding a third co-owner Michael Bodnarchek. Kristin Cruz (aka Kris Foster) and Heidi Santelli launched A Band Apart Music Videos as directors' rep and executive producer, respectively.

Company closure

Tarantino and Bender are no longer working together and Tarantino is the sole owner of A Band Apart Films. David Heyman (Harry Potter, Gravity) produced Tarantino's ninth film Once Upon a Time in Hollywood.

While the company is listed as studio for Tarantino's 2009 Inglourious Basterds and 2012 Django Unchained, and credited in the 2007 Grindhouse movies, it is unclear whether the company was reformed for the films or was credited for involvement in pre-2006 production of those films.

Filmography

Films produced and co-produced

Music videos produced (partial list)

References

External links
An Archive of the Company's Website circa 2001
City Pages feature on Michael Bodnarchek, co-founder of A Band Apart

1991 establishments in California
2006 disestablishments in California
American companies established in 1991
American companies disestablished in 2006
Companies based in Los Angeles
Defunct companies based in Greater Los Angeles
Defunct film and television production companies of the United States
Entertainment companies based in California
Film production companies of the United States
Mass media companies established in 1991
Mass media companies disestablished in 2006
Television production companies of the United States
Quentin Tarantino